Hsieh Cheng-peng and Yang Tsung-hua were the defending champions but chose not to defend their title.

Marco Chiudinelli and Teymuraz Gabashvili won the title after defeating Ruan Roelofse and Yi Chu-huan 6–1, 6–3 in the final.

Seeds

Draw

References
 Main Draw
 Qualifying Draw

Gimcheon Open ATP Challenger - Doubles
2017 Doubles